Anuoluwapo Juwon Opeyori (born 1 June 1997) is a Nigerian badminton player. He started playing badminton together with his brother in 2005, and later he was selected to join Nigeria senior national team in 2017. Opeyori won the African Championships and African Games in the singles event in 2019. He competed at the 2020 Summer Olympics.

Achievements

African Games 
Men's singles

Men's doubles

African Championships 
Men's singles

Men's doubles

BWF International Challenge/Series (6 titles, 9 runners-up) 
Men's singles

Men's doubles

Mixed doubles

  BWF International Challenge tournament
  BWF International Series tournament
  BWF Future Series tournament

References

External links 

1997 births
Living people
Sportspeople from Lagos
Nigerian male badminton players
Badminton players at the 2020 Summer Olympics
Olympic badminton players of Nigeria
Competitors at the 2019 African Games
African Games gold medalists for Nigeria
African Games silver medalists for Nigeria
African Games medalists in badminton
21st-century Nigerian people